Athmane Ariouet  (Arabic: عثمان عريوات; born 24 September 1948) is an actor in Algerian cinema, theater and television. Considered as one of the best and most distinguished character actors in Algerian cinema, Ariouet has been awarded multiple times in a career spanned for more than five decades.

Personal life
Ariouet was born on 24 September 1948 in Amdoukal in Barika, in the wilaya of Batna. He first attended the Algiers conservatory from 1969 to 1972.

Career
During school times, he had the passion to become a prolific actor. He unanimously won the first prize for diction in French. Late, his acting credibility was encouraged by the French teacher Henri Vangret. He then studied Arabic theater along with prominent actors Mustapha Kasdarli, Taha Laâmiri and Allal Mouhib. His maiden cinema acting came through 1963 film Le Résultat. In 1981, he acted in the television film The Executioner Cries directed by Abder Isker.

His 1994 cult film Carnaval Fi Dechra, considered as the most relentless caricature of a political system adrift. The film was directed by Mohamed Oukassi, is a comedy film which depicts Algerian society with derision. However, he was banned from acting after the film. In 2002, he returned to cinema acting with the film El Arch under the presidency guidance. In December 2003, he released his maiden film Er-roubla co-produced with ENTV.

In 2004, he retired from acting after the film Chronique des années pub in which he encountered financial difficulties as well as theatrical release ban. However, in 2017 at the forum of the daily El Moudjahid, former Minister of Culture Azzedine Mihoubi said that “the film was in the editing phase" and finally released in 2018.

In July 2020, Ariouet awarded with medals of “Achir” rank national merit under the guidance of President of the Republic Abdelmadjid Tebboune.

Filmography

References

External links
 
 Athmane Ariouet décoré par Abdelmadjid Tebboune

Living people
1948 births
Algerian actors
Algerian film actors
Algerian theatre people
21st-century Algerian people
Algerian television actors